Onbovo is a rural locality (a village) in Samotovinskoye Rural Settlement, Velikoustyugsky District, Vologda Oblast, Russia. The population was 30 as of 2002.

Geography 
Onbovo is located 5 km northwest of Veliky Ustyug (the district's administrative centre) by road. Popovkino is the nearest rural locality.

References 

Rural localities in Velikoustyugsky District